Hintonia may refer to:
 Hintonia (fish), a lanternfish genus
 Hintonia (plant), a plant genus in the family Rubiaceae